"I'll Be Seeing You" is a popular song about missing a loved one, with music by Sammy Fain and lyrics by Irving Kahal. Published in 1938, it was inserted into the Broadway musical Right This Way, which closed after fifteen performances. The title of the 1944 film I'll Be Seeing You was taken from this song at the suggestion of the film's producer, Dore Schary. The song is included in the film's soundtrack.

Background
A resemblance between the main tune's first four lines and a passage within the theme of the last movement of Gustav Mahler's Third Symphony (1896) was pointed out by Deryck Cooke in 1970.

Discography
The earliest recording of the song was by Dick Todd in 1940 on the Bluebird label.
 The recording by Bing Crosby became a hit in 1944, reaching number one for the week of July 1. 
 Frank Sinatra's version with Tommy Dorsey and His Orchestra from 1940 charted in 1944 and peaked at No. 4.  A new recording of the song by Frank Sinatra was included in 1961's I Remember Tommy. This new version went to No. 12 on the Easy Listening chart and No. 58 on the Hot 100.
 A recording by the Poni-Tails reached number 87 on the Billboard Hot 100 for the week ending November 16, 1959.
 Brenda Lee recorded the song as the final track of her 1962 album Sincerely, Brenda Lee, with the second verse spoken rather than sung.  This version features as a significant recurring theme in the 2018 film Out of Blue.

Other appearances
Yvette (Elsa Harris Silver, NBC contract vocalist) was featured singing the song, with spoken words added relevant to wartime, in the Olsen and Johnson film See My Lawyer (1945).
Billie Holiday's 1944 recording of the song was the final transmission sent by NASA to the Opportunity rover on Mars when its mission ended in February 2019.
Norah Jones recorded a version in 2020 in support of the New York Restoration Project during the COVID-19 pandemic and released a video of the performance.
Liberace's version plays during the credits to the (then) final episode of Beavis and Butt-head in 1997's Beavis and Butt-head Are Dead.Liberace's version plays during the credits to the 1990 movie "Misery" with James Cann.

Notes

Songs about nostalgia
1938 songs
1940 singles
1944 singles
1959 singles
Pop standards
Torch songs
Songs from musicals
Songs with music by Sammy Fain
Songs with lyrics by Irving Kahal